Onna-musha (女武者) is a term referring to female warriors in pre-modern Japan. These women fought in battle alongside samurai men. They were members of the bushi (warrior) class in feudal Japan and were trained in the use of weapons to protect their household, family, and honour in times of war. They also have an important presence in Japanese literature, with Tomoe Gozen and Hangaku Gozen as famous and influential examples representing onna-musha.

There were also , female guards of the harems and residences of the wives and concubines of daimyō and clan leaders.

Kamakura period

The Genpei War (1180–1185) marked the war between the Taira (Heike) and Minamoto (Genji) clans, two very prominent Japanese clans of the late-Heian period. The epic The Tale of the Heike was composed in the early 13th century in order to commemorate the stories of courageous and devoted samurai.  Among those was Tomoe Gozen, servant of Minamoto no Yoshinaka of the Minamoto clan. She assisted Yoshinaka in defending himself against the forces of his cousin, Minamoto no Yoritomo, especially during the Battle of Awazu in 1184.

In The Tale of the Heike, she was described as:

Tomoe Gozen was not always accredited as a historical figure. However, she has impacted much of the warrior class, including many traditional Naginata schools. Her actions in battle received much attention in the arts, such as the Noh play Tomoe and various ukiyo-e.

Another famous female general of the Genpei War was Hangaku Gozen. While Tomoe Gozen was an ally of the Minamoto clan, Hangaku allied with the Taira clan. The existence of these two prominent female generals confirms that the status of women during this time was still less unequal than in future periods.

In ages past, it was more common to see women become empresses, but this would change in the future during the Meiji restoration. Throughout Japanese history, women, while not generally becoming de jure chiefs of a samurai clan, de facto ruled their clans in several instances.

Chancellor Tōin Kinkata (1291–1360) makes mention in his journal Entairyaku (園太暦) of a "predominately female cavalry", but without further explanation. With limited details, he concludes: "there is a lot of female cavalries." As he noted that they were from western Japan, it is possible that women from the western regions far from the big capital cities were more likely to fight in battles.  Women forming cavalry forces were also reported during the Sengoku period (c. 1467 – c. 1600).

Sengoku period

During the Ashikaga Shogunate, due to tensions between the shogunate retainers, Japan went to war again. In 1460, when shōgun Ashikaga Yoshimasa abdicated his position to his younger brother Ashikaga Yoshimi, Hino Tomiko (Yoshimasa's wife) was strongly against this decision. Tomiko sought political and military support to rule as regent until the birth of her son, securing the support of Yamana Sōzen and other leaders of powerful samurai clans. Then she went to war against Yoshimasa and his supporters, especially the Hosokawa clan. This dispute for succession started the Ōnin War (1467–1477) and led to the beginning of the Sengoku period.

In the Azuchi–Momoyama period, when several daimyō took charge of their own affairs and fought against each other by territory, women of noble clans and even peasant women members of Ikkō-ikki, Ikkō-shu, Saika Ikki and others Ikki sects went to the battlefields. In 1569, when a Mori family retainer from western Japan went absent from a campaign, his wife Ichikawa no Tsubone assumed responsibility for the defense of Kōnomine Castle with her armed ladies-in-waiting. Attacks on yamashiro (山城; mountaintop castles), the characteristic fortress of the daimyō, have provided many unwanted opportunities for women to engage in defense and suffer the ultimate sacrifice if the castle falls.

Women participated in battles until the unification of Japan by Toyotomi Hideyoshi. In 1591 several women defended Kunohe Castle even when it was on fire in the Kunohe Rebellion. After Hideyoshi's death, his concubine Yodo-dono took over the de facto leadership of the Toyotomi clan, and in 1614 she and her son, Hideyori, fought the ascendant Tokugawa shogunate. In 1615, when Tokugawa Ieyasu attacked Osaka castle again, Yodo-dono and her son committed suicide in the flames of Osaka castle. Suicide inside a burning castle may have been the last act of loyalty to a samurai-class woman.

Evidence of female participation in battles

During the Sengoku period there are several accounts of women fighting actively on the battlefield, such as the cases of Myōrin, who inspired the people to fight against 3,000 Shimazu soldiers, Kaihime, who fought against the Toyotomi clan in the siege of Oshi (1590), Onamihime, who became the representative leader of the Nikaidō clan and fought in various battles against her nephew Date Masamune, and Akai Teruko, who became famous for fighting until she was 76 years old and became known as ''The Strongest Woman in the Warring States Period''. The actions of Ōhōri Tsuruhime earned her the title of ''Joan of Arc of Japan'', and established her as one of the most recognizable female warriors in Japanese history.

Japanese women were educated solely to become wives and mothers. Although most women knew about politics, martial arts, and diplomacy, they were not allowed to succeed clan leadership. However, there were exceptions. Ii Naotora took over the clan leadership after the death of all men of the Ii family; her efforts as a leader made her clan independent, and she became a daimyō. There were many noblewomen with great political influence in their clans, even to the extent they became de facto leaders. An acceptable example of women who became known as ''onna daimyō'' (female lords) are Jukei-ni and Toshoin. Both women acted for a long period as rulers of their respective domains, even though they were not considered heirs.

In the 16th century, there were combat units consisting only of women, as was the case of Ikeda Sen, who led 200 women musketeers (Teppo unit) in the Battle of Shizugatake and Battle of Komaki-Nagakute. Otazu no kata fought alongside 18 armed maids against Tokugawa Ieyasu's troops. Ueno Tsuruhime led thirty-four women in a suicidal charge against the Mōri army. Tachibana Ginchiyo, leader of the Tachibana clan, fought with her female troops in the Kyushu Campaign (1586), and in the siege of Yanagawa (1600) she organized a resistance formed by nuns against the advance of the Eastern Army.

In 1580, a woman from the Bessho clan joined a rebellion against Toyotomi Hideyoshi during the siege of Miki. Her husband Bessho Yoshichika was one of the leaders of the rebellion, and she played a key role during the siege, allying herself with the Mori clan. The rebellion lasted three years, until Bessho Nagaharu surrendered the castle to Hideyoshi. Lady Bessho committed suicide shortly after. In 1582, Oda Nobunaga launched a final attack on the Takeda clan in a series of battles known as the Battle of Tenmokuzan. Oda Nobutada (son of Nobunaga) led 50,000 soldiers against 3,000 Takeda allies during the siege of Takato castle. During this battle, it is recorded in the compilation of chronicles from the Oda clan, Shinchō kōki, that a woman from the Suwa clan defied Nobutada's forces.

During this era, the existence of female ninja (kunoichi) is recorded. Their training differed from that of male ninja, although they also had a core in common as they trained in taijutsu, kenjutsu, ninjutsu skills. A historically accepted example is Mochizuki Chiyome, a 16th-century noble descendant who was commissioned by warlord Takeda Shingen to recruit women to create a secret network of hundreds of spies.

It is believed that many more women participated in battles than have been documented in historical records. For example, DNA tests on 105 bodies excavated from the Battle of Senbon Matsubaru between Takeda Katsuyori and Hojo Ujinao in 1580 revealed that 35 of them were women. Other excavations were made in areas where battles took place away from castles. Japanese archeologist Suzuki Hiroatsu explains that although it is common to find bones of women or children where castle sieges took place, since they usually participated in the defense, the absence of a castle at the Senbon Matsubaru site led him to conclude that "these women came here to fight and to die", and could have been part of the army. According to these studies, 30% of battle corpses discovered away from castle sites were those of women. Excavations conducted on other battle sites across Japan gave similar results. According to Stephen Turnbull, the details of the excavation confirm the onna-musha were certainly present on the battlefield.

Edo period and beyond

 

Because of the influence of Edo neo-Confucianism (1600–1868), the status of the onna-musha diminished significantly. The function of onna-musha changed in accordance with that of their husbands. Samurai were no longer concerned with battles and war, but became bureaucrats. Women, specifically daughters of most upper-class households, were soon pawns to dreams of success and power. The roaring ideals of fearless devotion and selflessness were gradually replaced by quiet, passive, civil obedience.

Travel during the Edo period was demanding and unsettling for many female samurai due to tight restrictions. They always had to be accompanied by a man, since they were not allowed to travel by themselves. Additionally, they had to possess specific permits establishing their business and motives. Samurai women also received much harassment from officials who manned inspection checkpoints.

The onset of the 17th century marked a significant transformation in the social acceptance of women in Japan. Many samurai viewed women purely as child bearers; the concept of a woman being a fit companion for war was no longer conceivable. The relationship between a husband and wife could be correlated to that of a lord and his vassal. According to Ellis Amdur, "husbands and wives did not even customarily sleep together. The husband would visit his wife to initiate any sexual activity and afterwards would retire to his own room".

Although women learned exclusively naginata handling techniques, some women broke tradition and learned different techniques, such as Kenjutsu. Sasaki Rui, Chiba Sanako and Nakazawa Koto are examples of women who became prominent swordswomen in Edo period. During this time, female-led kenjutsu schools become commonplace, although traditionally the leadership of these schools is passed down patrilineally.

In 1868, during the Battle of Aizu in the Boshin War, Nakano Takeko, a member of the Aizu clan, was recruited to become leader of a female corps Jōshitai (娘子隊 Girls' Army), which fought against the onslaught of 20,000 soldiers of the Imperial Japanese Army of the Ōgaki Domain. Highly skilled at the naginata, Takeko and her corps of about 20 joined 3000 other Aizu samurai in battle. The Hōkai-ji in Aizubange, Fukushima province contains a monument erected in her honor. Less-celebrated but no less remarkable would be the efforts of Yamamoto Yaeko, Matsudaira Teru and Yamakawa Futaba, who served as fighter defending Aizuwakamatsu Castle during the Battle of Aizu. Yaeko would later be one of the first civil leaders for women's rights in Japan.

The end of the Edo period was a time of great political turmoil that continued into the Meiji period (1868–1912). A revolt against policies of the new Meiji government was led by samurai of the Satsuma domain (called the Satsuma Rebellion) in 1877. Over the nearly 1,000 years of the samurai class's existence, women have proved to be the last resistance during a military siege. The last records of women of the samurai class participating in battles were during the Satsuma Rebellion. Several women were said to have fought in battle in defense of the city of Kagoshima. The rebellion also effectively ended the samurai class, as the new Imperial Japanese Army built of conscripts without regard to social class had proven itself in battle, ending here the history of the onna-musha.

Weapons

The most popular weapon-of-choice of onna-musha is the naginata, which is a versatile, conventional polearm with a curved blade at the tip. The weapon is mainly favored for its length, which can compensate for the strength and body size advantage of male opponents.

The naginata has a niche between the katana and the yari, which is rather effective in close quarter melee when the opponent is kept at bay, and is also relatively efficient against cavalry. Through its use by many legendary samurai women, the naginata has become the iconic armament of the woman warrior. During the Edo period, many schools focusing on the use of the naginata were created and perpetuated its association with women.

Additionally, as most of the time their primary purpose as onna-musha was to safeguard their homes from marauders, emphasis was laid on ranged weapons to be shot from defensive structures.

Legacy

The image of samurai women continues to be impactful in martial arts, historical novels, books, and popular culture in general. Like kunoichi (female ninja) and geisha, the onna-musha's conduct is seen as the ideal of Japanese women in movies, animations and TV series. In the West, the onna-musha gained popularity when the historical documentary Samurai Warrior Queens aired on the Smithsonian Channel. Several other channels reprised the documentary. The 56th NHK taiga drama, Naotora: The Lady Warlord, was the first NHK drama where the female protagonist is the head of a samurai clan. The 52nd NHK taiga drama, Yae no Sakura, focuses on Niijima Yae, a woman warrior who fought in Boshin War. This drama portrays Nakano Takeko, Matsudaira Teru, and other onna-musha. Another taiga dramas that portrays the famous onna-musha Tomoe Gozen is the Yoshitsune (TV series), broadcast in 2005.

In Japan, Tomoe Gozen and Nakano Takeko influenced naginata schools and their techniques. Whether formed by men or women, these schools usually revere the onna-musha. During the annual Aizu Autumn Festival, a group of young girls wearing hakama and shiro headbands take part in the procession, commemorating the actions of Nakano and the Jōshitai (Girls' Army). Other important examples are Yamakawa Futaba and Niijima Yae, who become symbols of the struggle for Japanese women's rights. Some of the onna-musha have become symbolic of a city or prefecture. Ii Naotora and Tachibana Ginchiyo are often celebrated at the Hamamatsu and Yanagawa festivals respectively. The warrior nun Myōrin is celebrated in the Tsurusaki region of the Ōita city, and Ōhōri Tsuruhime is the protagonist in local folklore and festivals on Ōmishima island. Several other samurai-class women are celebrated in pop culture, commerce, and folklore.

Famous onna-musha

These are famous onna-musha with extraordinary achievements in history:
 Empress Jingū: A semi-legendary Regent Empress who was involved in many impactful events in Japanese history and led an invasion of Korean Peninsula.
 Nakano Takeko: The leader of the Jōshitai (Girls' Army), she participated in the Boshin war, leading several women in a charge against the Imperial forces. Due to the reforms of the Meiji era, Takeko and the women of Jōshitai were some of the last samurai in history.
 Niijima Yae:  She was one of the last samurai in history. She fought in the Boshin War and served as a nurse in the Russo-Japanese War and the Sino-Japanese War. Later she became a scholar and became one of the symbols of the struggle for women's rights. Yae was one of the first people to be decorated by the Meiji Empire.
 Tomoe Gozen: An extraordinary woman warrior who fought in conflicts that led to the establishment of the first shogunate in Japan. Her legacy influenced several generations of samurai.
 Yodo-dono: A noblewoman who was the castellan of Yodo castle and later became the real head of Osaka castle. She led many political events after the death of her husband, Hideyoshi. As guardian of Hideyori (Hideyoshi's son), she challenged the Tokugawa clan, thus leading the Siege of Osaka, the last battle of the Sengoku period that ended the period of war for the next 250 years.

Others

 Akai Teruko
 Yamakawa Futaba
 Ashikaga Ujinohime
 Tsuruhime
 Tachibana Ginchiyo
 Kaihime
 Ii Naotora
 Myōrin
 Hangaku Gozen
 Komatsuhime
 Maeda Matsu
 Munakata Saikaku
 Nakazawa Koto
 Sasaki Rui
 Lady Ichikawa
 Ikeda Sen
 Matsudaira Teru
 Miyohime
 Otazu no kata
 Onamihime
 Lady Otsuya
 Ueno Tsuruhime
 Katakura Kita
 Fujishiro Gozen
 Kamehime
 Katō Tsune
 Kushihashi Teru
 Myōki
 Numata Jakō
 Oni Gozen
 Okaji no Kata
 Okyō
 Omasa
 Shigashi
 Lady Shirai
 Yuki no Kata
 Seishin-ni
 Tōshōin
 Jinbo Yukiko

See also

 Himiko
 Toyo (queen)
Kunoichi
Female castellans in Japan
Empress of Japan
Woman warrior

References

Sources

 Beasley, W. G. (1999). The Japanese Experience:  A Short History of Japan. University of California Press.
 Jansen, Marius B. (2000) The Making of Modern Japan. The Belknap Press of Harvard University Press 2000
 Yamakawa Kikue; trans Nakai, Kate Wildman (2001) Women of the Mito Domain: Recollections of Samurai Family Life. Stanford University Press 2001

External links

Japanese warriors
 
Combat occupations
Noble titles